Ossi and Wessi ( – "easterner";  – "westerner") are the informal names that people in Germany call former citizens of East Germany and West Germany before re-unification (1945–1990). These names represent the lingering differences between the two pre-reunification cultures, and Germany's popular culture includes many Ossi-Wessi-jokes and clichés. While some people in Germany may consider these names insulting, others regard them as part of the German culture.

There is also the name Besserwessi (besser meaning "better") which is a pun on Besserwisser ("know-it-all") and thus indicates a Wessi who feels superior to Ossis. Some former East Germans feel that former West Germans do not respect their culture and that East Germans were assimilated into West German culture, rather than the two cultures being united as equals. These people are sometimes called Jammerossis (jammer meaning complaining).This term was named German Word of the Year in 1991. Politically speaking, in the German Reunification East Germany was indeed incorporated into West Germany under existing West German law. This solution was taken in order to legally avoid the necessity of creating a new constitution as demanded by the West German "Grundgesetz".

See also
 New states of Germany
 East-German jokes

References

German words and phrases
East Germany–West Germany relations